On the Beach is a 1908 oil on canvas painting by Eugen de Blaas held in a private collection.

Description 
This  oil painting was created by Eugen de Blaas in 1908. The work centers on a clothed but barefoot woman. Standing on a beach, she places her hands behind her head. Next to her is a basket. The woman and the basket are detailed, while in the background, we see vegetation with little detail. The blur increases in the background with a body of water, buildings and the sky.

References 

1908 paintings
Paintings by Eugene de Blaas